Volleyball at the 2013 Canada Summer Games was held at the Université de Sherbrooke's Centre Sportifin Sherbrooke, Quebec.

The events will be held during the first week between August 3 and 8, 2013.

Medal table
The following is the medal table for diving at the 2013 Canada Summer Games.

Medalists

Men's

Group A

Group B

Playoffs

Women's

Group C

Group D

Playoffs

References

2013 in volleyball
2013 Canada Summer Games
2013 Canada Summer Games